Nataliya Viktorivna Tobias (née Sydorenko (Сидоренко); born 22 November 1980 in Serov, Soviet Union) is a female former middle-distance runner from Ukraine, who specialized in the 1500 metres. She holds personal bests of 4:01.78 minutes for the 1500 m, 2:02.31 minutes for the 800 metres, and 8:51.32 minutes for the 3000 metres.

Tobias represented her country at the Olympics twice, including a 1500 m bronze medal at the 2008 Beijing Olympics. She also competed at the World Championships in Athletics in 2007 and 2011, and was the 1500 m gold medallist at the 2003 Summer Universiade. During her career, she won Ukrainian national titles in five different events.

Tobias received a two-year ban in 2012 for testing positive for testosterone at the 2011 World Athletics Championships.

International competitions

National titles
Ukrainian Athletics Championships
800 m: 2006
3000 m steeplechase: 2007
5000 m: 2003

Ukrainian Indoor Athletics Championships
1500 m: 2004, 2008, 2011
3000 m: 2003, 2011

Personal bests
800 metres - 2:02.31 min (2006)
1500 metres - 4:01.78 min (2008)
3000 metres - 8:51.32 min (2003)
5000 metres - 15:52.28 min (2003)

References

External links

1980 births
Living people
People from Serov
Ukrainian female middle-distance runners
Ukrainian female steeplechase runners
Olympic athletes of Ukraine
Olympic bronze medalists for Ukraine
Olympic bronze medalists in athletics (track and field)
Athletes (track and field) at the 2004 Summer Olympics
Athletes (track and field) at the 2008 Summer Olympics
Medalists at the 2008 Summer Olympics
World Athletics Championships athletes for Ukraine
Universiade medalists in athletics (track and field)
Universiade gold medalists for Ukraine
Doping cases in athletics
Ukrainian sportspeople in doping cases
Competitors at the 2001 Summer Universiade
Medalists at the 2003 Summer Universiade